Joe Marsh (born October 26, 1951) is a retired American ice hockey coach. He was the head coach of the St. Lawrence Saints men's ice hockey team from 1985 through the end of the 2011–12 season. The New Hampshire graduate lead the Saints to an NCAA tournament berth in only his second year and a runner-up finish the following season, St. Lawrence's first Frozen Four appearance in 26 years. Over the next 26 season Marsh became the most successful head coach in school history in terms of tenure, wins (482), conference regular season titles (2), conference tournament titles (5), conference championship appearances (8) and NCAA tournament appearances (8). Only George Menard has more Frozen Four appearances (5) with St. Lawrence than Marsh's 2 in 1988 and 2000.

Head coaching record

See also
List of college men's ice hockey coaches with 400 wins

References

External links
 

1951 births
Living people
American ice hockey coaches
American men's ice hockey forwards
New Hampshire Wildcats men's ice hockey players
St. Lawrence Saints men's ice hockey coaches
Sportspeople from Lynn, Massachusetts
Ice hockey coaches from Massachusetts
Ice hockey players from Massachusetts